Ricky Gianco (born Riccardo Sanna, Lodi 1943), formerly known as Ricky Sanna, is an Italian singer, songwriter, guitarist and record producer, considered one of the founders of Italian rock music. He reached the apex of his popularity as a singer in the 1960s, when he was one of the so-called "urlatori" (literally: "screamers"), a group of early rock singers which also included Adriano Celentano, Little Tony, Tony Dallara, and others.

In his early career, between the late 1950s and the early 1960s, Gianco played in several bands, including I Ribelli (also known as Celentano's Clan Celentano) and I Quelli (which would later develop into Premiata Forneria Marconi). He also collaborated with Luigi Tenco, Enzo Jannacci, and Gino Paoli, among others. His most renowned solo works are from the mid-1960s, when he became a declared fan of The Beatles and moved from rock and roll to a more oriented pop sound.

In the 1970s, he began expanding his range activities, working on theatre projects and as a record producer as well as a musician. He is co-writer of Michelle Beatles song

Discography

Albums
1963: Una giornata con Ricky Gianco (Jaguar, JGR 73000)
1965: Ai miei amici di "Ciao amici" (Jaguar, JGR 74002)
1965: Ricky Gianco Show (Jaguar, JGR 74003)
1968: Ricky Gianco Special (Dischi Ricordi, MRP 9051)
1975: Braccio di Ferro (Intingo, ITGL 14005)
1976: Quel rissoso, irascibile, carissimo Braccio di Ferro (Intingo, ITGL 14007)
1976: Alla mia mam... (Ultima Spiaggia, ZLUS 55187)
1978: Arcimboldo (Ultima Spiaggia, ZPLS 34046)
1979: Liquirizia (soundtrack) (Fontana Records, 6323 811)
1982: Non si può smettere di fumare (Fonit-Cetra, LPX 100)
1989: Di nuca (New Enigma, NEM 47714)
1991: È Rock'n Roll (Fonit-Cetra, TLPX 277)
1992: Piccolo è bello (Fonit-Cetra)
1995: Il meglio di Ricky Gianco (compilation, D.V. MORE)
1997: Ricky Gianco: i successi (compilation, D.V. MORE)
2000: Tandem (Ricky Gianco & ...) (compilation of collaborations, CBS, COL 497529 1)
2005: Ricky Gianco Collection (compilation, EDEL)
2009:  Di santa ragione, EDEL
2010:  Come un bambino (On Sale Music, 64 OSM 084)

Italian male singers
Italian songwriters
Male songwriters
Italian guitarists
Italian male guitarists
1943 births
Living people